Theinhko (also Theinkho, ; c. 919 – 956) was king of the Pagan dynasty of Burma (Myanmar) from c. 934 to c. 956. According to the Burmese chronicles, Theinhko was a son of the previous king, Sale Ngahkwe. Theinhko was killed by a farmer, Nyaung-u Sawrahan, from whose farm he took a cucumber. The king had been on a hunting trip and separated from his retinue, exhausted and thirsty. The farmer was accepted as king by the queen to prevent unrest in the kingdom and became known as the "Cucumber King", "farmer king" or "Taungthugyi Min".

The story is likely a fairy tale. There are at least three other versions—an exact parallel in the Burmese fairy tale "Princess Thudhammasari" and two variants in Cambodian history, one in the eighth and another in the 14th century. Kings of Cambodia claim descent from the gardener.

Various chronicles do not agree on the dates regarding his life and reign. The oldest chronicle Zatadawbon Yazawin is considered to be the most accurate for the Pagan period. The table below lists the dates given by four main chronicles, as well as Hmannan's dates when anchored by the Anawrahta's inscriptionally verified accession date of 1044.

References

Bibliography
 
 
 
 

Pagan dynasty
910s births
950s deaths
Year of birth uncertain
Year of death uncertain
10th-century Burmese monarchs